Edmond Al-Homsi (1901 -1972), was a Syrian politician who served as Minister of Finance for two terms in 1936 and 1946.

Background 
He studied sociology and political science at American University of Beirut and studied postgraduate degree in Banking and finance at University of Oxford.

Career 
He cofounded the National Bloc in 1928, and served as Minister of Finance for two terms in 1936 and 1946. He also was the ambassador of Syria in London and Brussels.

References 

Syrian ministers of finance
Syrian politicians
1901 births
1972 deaths
American University of Beirut alumni
Alumni of the University of Oxford
Syrian expatriates in the United Kingdom